The Papal slippers are a historical accoutrement worn by the Pope. The papal slippers were a form of episcopal sandals worn by bishops. However, unlike the (rarely seen) episcopal sandals, which change with the liturgical colour, the papal slippers were always red.

Usually elaborate, papal slippers were made by hand with red satin, red silk, and gold thread; they featured an embroidered cross garnished with rubies and the soles were made of leather. Until the first half of the 20th century, it was customary for pilgrims having an audience with the Pope to kneel and kiss one of his slippers.

The pope traditionally wore the slippers inside the papal apartments, while red leather papal shoes were worn outdoors. Pope Paul VI discontinued the use of the papal slippers but continued to wear the red outdoor papal shoes, which were abandoned by Pope John Paul II in favour of cordovan brown leather walking shoes made in his native Poland. 

Pope Benedict XVI restored the use of the red outdoor papal shoes, similar to those worn by Paul VI. However, it would seem that the papal slippers were not restored as photographs of Benedict showed him wearing red shoes inside the confines of the Vatican. The Pope was reported (perhaps erroneously) to have been wearing red slippers upon his arrival in Scotland on 16 September 2010.

Pope Francis has since, once again, discontinued the use of the shoe. He wears simple black dress shoes.

See also
Papal shoes
Episcopal sandals

References

External links
Episcopal Sandals article from the Catholic Encyclopedia (1912)
Information and illustration in over 170 pictures of papal and clerical shoes

Papal vestments
State ritual and ceremonies
Catholic liturgy
Historical footwear